Walter Philip Kellenberg (June 3, 1901 – January 11, 1986) was an American prelate of the Roman Catholic Church. He served as bishop of the Diocese of Ogdensburg in Northern New York (1954–1957) and bishop of the Diocese of Rockville Centre in New York (1957–1976).

Biography

Early life 
Walter Kellenberg was born in the Bronx, New York, to Conrad and Elizabeth (née Kern) Kellenberg. He received his early education at the parochial school of St. Anthony of Padua Parish in Bronx, New York.  He then attended Fordham Preparatory School in the Bronx and Cathedral College in Queens, New York.  Kellenberg made his theological studies at St. Joseph's Seminary in Yonkers, New York. He also took courses in real estate, insurance, and business administration at Columbia University.

Priesthood 
Kellenberg was ordained to the priesthood on June 2, 1928. His first assignment was as a curate at St. Mary's Parish in the Rosebank neighborhood of Staten Island, New York for six years. In 1934, he was transferred to St. Paul's Parish in Manhattan and appointed to the archdiocesan curia. Within a year, Kellenberg became a curate at St. Patrick's Cathedral Parish, and was named assistant chancellor and secretary of the archdiocesan Commission for Real Estate and Insurance in 1939.

Kellenberg became temporary administrator of St. John the Baptist Parish in Staten Island. and St. Nicholas Parish in Manhattan, and was named vice-chancellor in 1942. He was named a papal chamberlain in 1943, and served as secretary to Cardinal Francis Spellman from 1947 to 1950. He was later made chancellor (1947), domestic prelate (1948), and moderator of the coordinating committee of the Archdiocesan Catholic Lay Organization (1951).

Auxiliary Bishop of New York 
On August 25, 1953, Kellenberg was appointed auxiliary bishop of New York and titular bishop of Ioannina by Pope Pius XII.  He received his episcopal consecration on the following October 5 from Cardinal James McIntyre, with Bishops William Scully and Joseph Flannelly serving as co-consecrators.

Bishop of Ogdensburg 
Following the transfer of Bishop Bryan McEntegart to the Catholic University of America, Kellenberg was named the sixth bishop of the Diocese of Ogdensburg on January 19, 1954. That same year, he received an honorary degree from Fordham University. He expanded the diocese's Departments of Education and Catechetics and increased the number of parochial schools.

Bishop of Rockville Centre 

He remained in Ogdensburg for three years, when he was appointed the first Bishop of the newly erected Diocese of Rockville Centre on April 16, 1957. He founded the diocese's Catholic Charities office that same year.

On April 12, 1959, at Mitchel Air Force Base, Kellenberg dedicated the medal of Our Lady of Loreto. In 1920 Pope Benedict XV had declared the Madonna of Loreto patron saint of air travelers and pilots.From 1962 to 1965, he attended all four sessions of the Second Vatican Council. Three colleges, eighteen high schools and a number of parish schools were established during his tenure.

Retirement and legacy 
Shortly before reaching the mandatory retirement age of 75, Kellenberg resigned as bishop on May 3, 1976. Kellenberg died from a heart attack at Mercy Hospital in Rockville Centre at age 84.

Kellenberg Memorial High School in Uniondale, New York is named in his honor. A stained glass window in St. Boniface Church in Elmont, New York depicts Pope John XXIII welcoming Kellenberg to the council. His coat of arms in depicted stained glass window in the windows of the formal lounge in Queen's Court on Fordham's Rose Hill Campus. The Hicksville Knights of Columbus Council 728 is named in honor of Kellenberg.

References

1903 births
1986 deaths
Participants in the Second Vatican Council
Saint Joseph's Seminary (Dunwoodie) alumni
Columbia University alumni
Roman Catholic bishops of Ogdensburg
20th-century Roman Catholic bishops in the United States
Fordham Preparatory School alumni